State Avenue Connex is a new BRT serving State Avenue between Downtown Kansas City, Missouri & 109th & Parallel, with transit improvements.

External links 
 Kansas City Transportation Authority

Transportation in Kansas City, Missouri